Walid Derrardja (born September 18, 1990 in Boudouaou) is an Algerian football player who is currently playing as a midfielder for MC Oran in the Algerian Ligue Professionnelle 1.

Honours
 Algerian Ligue Professionnelle 1 top scorer: 2014–15

References

External links
 

1990 births
Living people
Algerian footballers
Algeria under-23 international footballers
NA Hussein Dey players
MC El Eulma players
MC Alger players
MC Oran players
Algerian Ligue 2 players
People from Boudouaou
People from Boudouaou District
People from Boumerdès Province
Kabyle people
Algerian Ligue Professionnelle 1 players
Association football midfielders
21st-century Algerian people